The Committee is a 1968 British independent black-and-white film noir film. It featured original music by Pink Floyd as well as Arthur Brown's song "Nightmare".

Plot
The movie follows a man (Paul Jones) who is unnamed. The movie starts out with the central character in a car with a man (Tom Kempinski) who just picked him up. The victim talks to him, but he is uninterested. The victim decides to pull over because he does not like the sound of the engine. While he is looking under the bonnet of the car the central character slams the bonnet down on his head several times, decapitating him in the process. The central character eventually sews the head back on, and the victim wakes up. The central character tells him he does not want to drive anymore that day and to leave without him.

A few years later the central character is called on to be part of a committee, groups that supposedly keep the system running but really do not do much of anything. The committee consists of 300 people who meet in a country estate, where there is swimming, tennis and boating during non-working hours, and a dance with a live band one evening. The man feels paranoid that the committee was called on account of him, and runs into the victim while there, who does not seem to remember him.

The central character talks about this with a man listed as 'The committee director' (Robert Langdon Lloyd) in the credits. This conversation lasts for the duration of the movie, and features most of the music Pink Floyd wrote for the film. At the end of the committee's weekend retreat, the man checks out, meeting a young woman whose bags he helps carry out. She offers him a lift and they drive off. She asks him if he plays bridge, but he does not answer her.

Cast
 Arthur Brown as Himself
 Jimmy Gardner as Boss
 Paul Jones as Central figure
 Tom Kempinski as Victim
 Robert Langdon Lloyd as Committee Director (as Robert Lloyd)
 Pauline Munro as Girl

Soundtrack

 The Committee (Part 1 backwards version) – 0:36
 The Committee (Part 1) – 0:36
 The Committee (Part 2) – 1:09
 The Committee (Part 3) – 2:56
 The Committee (Part 4) – 1:24
 The Committee (Part 5) – 2:06
 The Committee (Part 6) – 0:50
 The Committee (Part 7) – 2:38
 The Committee (Part 8) – 3:30

Titles taken from A Tree Full of Secrets bootleg. "The Committee (Part 1 backwards version)" is the original recording, which was reversed for the film. "The Committee (Part 7)" is an early recording of "Careful with That Axe, Eugene". The soundtrack is also on other bootlegs that are just called The Committee. It also has the Arthur Brown track. "Prelude-Nightmare". It has been often misquoted that his song "Fire" is in the film, but it is not. The confusion possibly due to the fact that he wears the same "flaming head-gear" that he used in the Fire footage, often seen on TV.

Release
The Committee has only been released once on DVD and Blu-ray, as part of the 2016 Pink Floyd box set The Early Years 1965–1972.

References

External links

1968 films
British independent films
1960s musical drama films
1968 independent films
Films scored by Pink Floyd
Films directed by Peter Sykes
British musical drama films
1968 drama films
1960s English-language films
1960s British films